Arjuna is a 2015 Indian Kannada crime drama film directed by P. C. Shekar and stars Prajwal Devaraj, Devaraj and Bhama in the lead roles. First time father (Devaraj) and son (Prajwal Devaraj) share the screen. The film's music is scored by Arjun Janya. Positive reviews from the critics.

Plot
Arjuna is shown as a very good guy with great conscience. There is no clue about his dealing with a murder. But when the murder news opens up, Arjuna becomes uneasy, which deepens ACP Verma's doubt. 
The director does his job in a good manner in the first half. But the second half betrays us. The suspense eventually ends up in losing its flavor. The real reason for Arjuna's transformation could have been handled much better.

Devaraj comes out with a splendid performance. Prajwal, his real life offspring, has imbibed his role to a good extent and does it commendably. Bhama comes only in few scenes in the film, but does a neat job. The film has its share of double meaning dialogues, and they do nothing to make you smile. Dynamic's Star Devaraj's stunts are just ok.
Updated by: Emjay Khan

Cast
 Prajwal Devaraj as Arjuna 
 Devaraj as CBI Officer
 Bhama
 Ramesh Bhat
 Sheethal
 Kaddipudi Chandru as MLA
 Rajashekar Naidu as Police Commissioner

Production
P. C. Shekar had earlier titled the film as Kshatriya and cast Prajwal Devaraj and Devaraj opposite each other for the first time. Bhama was chosen to play the female lead. Since the title had already been registered by another producer, Shekar renamed the film as Arjuna. The official trailer was released on 30 July 2015 in the presence of actor Ganesh.

Soundtrack

The film's soundtrack and original score is composed by Arjun Janya. The track list comprises only one song and three instrumental themes. Arjun Janya played all the themes during the audio launch on 14 July 2015 with his piano.

Track listing

References

External links
Arjuna Movie at Twitter
Bhama Teamed with Prajwal

2015 films
2015 crime drama films
2010s Kannada-language films
Films scored by Arjun Janya
2015 masala films
Indian crime drama films
Indian films about revenge